Piek Th.J.M. Vossen (born 1960 in Schaesberg, the Netherlands), is professor of computational lexicology at the VU University Amsterdam, head of the Computational Lexicology & Terminology Lab, and founder and president of the Global WordNet Association.

Education 
Vossen graduated from the University of Amsterdam in Dutch and general linguistics and obtained a PhD (cum laude) in computational lexicology in 1995 at the same university.

Awards 
Vossen is a recipient of the 2013 Spinoza Prize and a winner of the "Enlighten Your Research"-competition 2013 with the project "Can we Handle the News".

Vossen was elected a member of the Royal Netherlands Academy of Arts and Sciences in 2017.

References

External links 
 
 Faculty page at the VU University Amsterdam

1960 births
Living people
Members of the Royal Netherlands Academy of Arts and Sciences
People from Landgraaf
Spinoza Prize winners
University of Amsterdam alumni
Academic staff of Vrije Universiteit Amsterdam